Who's Doing the Dishes? is a cooking game show that aired on ITV from 1 September 2014 to 14 October 2016. It is hosted by Brian McFadden.

Format
Who's Doing the Dishes? featured four diners in a celebrity's home who cooked them a three-course meal. The diners had to guess the identity of the celebrity from six clues that the celebrity would come up with. Three were given in the names of the dishes and three were given around the house. If the diners guessed the celebrity's identity correctly, they would win a £500 cash prize and the celebrity had to wash the dishes. If they guessed wrong, the contestants had to wash the dishes themselves. In series 2, "Brian's Bonus" was introduced. This was an extra clue from McFadden, which if taken, reduced the day's winnings from £500 to £400.

Transmissions

References

External links

2010s British cooking television series
2010s British game shows
2014 British television series debuts
2016 British television series endings
British cooking television shows
English-language television shows
ITV game shows
Television series by ITV Studios